Neckera is a large genus of mosses belonging to the family Neckeraceae. The genus was first described by Johann Hedwig. The genus has a cosmopolitan distribution.

Description

Gametophye 
Medium-sized to large mosses that form shelf growth forms. They are light to dark green in colour, or sometimes yellowish. They tend to be shiny.

The creeping stems are irregularly branched. Paraphyllia (the trichome-like or foliose structures on moss stem surfaces) may be present or absent.

The secondary stem and branch leaves range from erect to spreading. The leaf like structures may be secund (on one side only), ovate (oval shaped), obovate (narrower edge at the base), oblong (elongated), oblong-ligulate (long and strap-shaped), or oblong-lanceolate (long and lance shaped). They may be asymmetric or flat or strongly undulate (wavy edged). The margins are entire to serrate with recurved teeth. The apex is obtuse to acuminate and the costa (midrib) double and short, or sometimes single or absent. The basal laminal cells are linear to rectangular. The walls may or may not be pitted.

Sporophye 
The capsules are cylindric, oblong, or globose. The exostome teeth are lanceolate and smooth to densely papillose. They somewhat cross striate basally. The endostome basal membrane is low to high. The segments are smooth to densely papillose. The surrounding perichaetial inner leaves (modified leaves surrounding the sex organs or later the seta)  are oblong, oblong-lanceolate, or ovate-subulate.

Reproduction 
Plants are autoicous (male and female reproductive structures on the same plant but on separate branches) or dioicous (male and female reproductive structures on separate plants). The spores are 12-39 µm in size.

Species 

The following species are recognised:

References

Neckeraceae
Moss genera
Taxa named by Johann Hedwig